Llanfendigaid Estate, located on the Cardigan Bay  coast of southern Gwynedd, near Tywyn in north Wales is a mid-Georgian house that has belonged to the same family for over 600 years. Llanfendigaid is listed Grade II* by Cadw which is only given to houses of exceptional historic interest.

History
The Nanney-Wynn family and their ancestors have occupied the lands of Llanfendigaid since it was first recorded in approximately 1241, the main house was built in the 13th century, and it was renovated to its present design in 1746. John Nanney married the Anwyl heiress in the early 17th century which means the family is related to Evan Vaughan Anwyl who descends from Owain Gwynedd.

Llanfendigaid is a member of Premier Cottages and is operated as a high quality flex-catering complex.

Listing the home for sale in 2021, the former Army officer Will Garton-Jones is the last of 40 generations of the Wynn-Nanney family to own the house, the estate has an asking price of £2m.

References

External links

Buildings and structures in Gwynedd
Llangelynin, Gwynedd